Charles T. Jordan  (October 4, 1871 – June 1, 1928), nicknamed "Kid",  was a Major League Baseball pitcher who played for the 1896 Philadelphia Phillies.

External links

1871 births
1928 deaths
Major League Baseball pitchers
Baseball players from Pennsylvania
Philadelphia Phillies players
19th-century baseball players
Hazleton Barons players
Hazleton Quay-kers players
Philadelphia Athletics (minor league) players
Guelph Maple Leafs players
Newark Colts players
Lawrence Colts players
Concord Marines players
Norfolk Tars players
Lynchburg Shoemakers players
New Castle Quakers players